The 1996 Oporto Open was a men's tennis tournament played on outdoor clay courts in Porto in Portugal and was part of the World Series of the 1996 ATP Tour. It was the second and final edition of the tournament and ran from June 10 through June 16, 1996. Félix Mantilla won the singles title.

Champions

Men's singles

 Félix Mantilla defeated  Hernán Gumy 6–7(7–5), 6–4, 6–3
 It was Mantilla's only title of the year and the 1st of his career.

Men's doubles

 Emanuel Couto /  Bernardo Mota defeated  Joshua Eagle /  Andrew Florent 4–6, 6–4, 6–4
 It was Couto's only title of the year and the 1st of his career. It was Mota's only title of the year and the 1st of his career.

Oporto Open
Oporto Open
1996 in Portuguese tennis
June 1996 sports events in Europe